Janis Coppin (born 11 May 1988) is a Belgian professional football striker who plays for KM Torhout in the Belgian Second Division. From 2007 to 2009 he played for Zulte Waregem, before moving to Mons.

References
 Guardian Football
 
 
 Janis Coppin at Footballdatabase

1988 births
Living people
Belgian footballers
Beerschot A.C. players
K.S.V. Roeselare players
S.V. Zulte Waregem players
R.A.E.C. Mons players
F.C.V. Dender E.H. players
K.V.V. Coxyde players
Belgian Pro League players
Challenger Pro League players
Association football forwards
Royal FC Mandel United players